National Medal can refer to:
 National Medal (Australia)
 National Medal of Arts
 National Humanities Medal
 National Medal of Science
 National Medal of Technology and Innovation